The 42nd Daytime Creative Arts Emmy Awards ceremony, which honors the crafts behind American daytime television programming, was held at the  Hilton Universal City Hotel in Los Angeles on April 24, 2015. The event was presented in conjunction with the 42nd Daytime Emmy Awards by the National Academy of Television Arts and Sciences. The nominations were announced on March 31, 2015.

The ceremony was held with Jeopardy! icon Alex Trebek and The Brady Bunch actress Florence Henderson serving as the ceremony's hosts.

Winners and nominees

In the lists below, the winner of the category is in bold.

Animated programs

Children's Series

Drama Series

Outstanding Legal/Courtroom Series

Lifestyle, Culinary, and Travel programs

Outstanding Spanish Programs

Special Classes

References

042 Creative Arts
2014 television awards
2014 in American television